Boston City Hall is the seat of city government of Boston, Massachusetts. It includes the offices of the mayor of Boston and the Boston City Council. The current hall was built in 1968 to assume the functions of the Old City Hall.

It is a controversial and prominent example of Brutalist architecture, part of the modernist movement. It was designed by the architecture firms Kallmann McKinnell & Knowles and Campbell, Aldrich & Nulty, with LeMessurier Consultants as engineers.

Together with the surrounding plaza, City Hall is part of the Government Center complex. This project constituted a major urban redesign effort in the 1960s, as Boston demolished an area of substandard housing and businesses.

The building has been subject to widespread public condemnation, and is sometimes called one of the world's ugliest buildings. Calls for the structure to be demolished have been regularly made even before construction was finished. Architects and critics considered it to be excellent work, with one poll finding that professional architects describe Boston City Hall as one of the ten proudest achievements of American architecture.

Design

Boston City Hall was designed by Gerhard Kallmann, a Columbia University professor, and Michael McKinnell, a Columbia graduate student, (who co-founded Kallmann McKinnell & Knowles). In 1962 they won an international, two-stage design competition for the building. Their design, selected from 256 entries by a jury of prominent architects and businessmen, departed from the more conventional designs of most of the other entries (typified by pure geometrical forms clad with sleek curtain walls) to introduce an articulated structure that expressed the internal functions of the buildings in rugged, cantilevered concrete forms. While hovering over the broad brick plaza, the City Hall was designed to create an open and accessible place for the city's government, with the most heavily used public activities all located on the lower levels directly connected to the plaza. The major civic spaces, including the Council chamber, library, and Mayor's office, were one level up, and the administrative offices were housed above these, behind the repetitive brackets of the top floors.

At a time when monumentality was typically considered an appropriate attribute for governmental architecture, the architects sought to create a bold statement of modern civic democracy, placed within the historic city of Boston. While the architects looked to precedents by Le Corbusier, especially the monastery of Sainte Marie de La Tourette, with its cantilevered upper floors, exposed concrete structure, and a similar interpretation of public and private spaces, they also drew from the example of Medieval and Renaissance Italian town halls and public spaces, as well as from the bold granite structures of 19th-century Boston (including Alexander Parris' Quincy Market immediately to the east).

Many of the elements in the design have been seen as abstractions of classical design elements, such as the coffers and the architrave above the concrete columns. Kallmann, McKinnell, and Knowles collaborated with two other Boston architectural firms and one engineering firm to form the "Architects and Engineers for the Boston City Hall" as the entity responsible for construction, which took place from 1963 to 1968.

The architects designed City Hall as divided into three sections, aesthetically and also by use. The lowest portion of the building, the brick-faced base, which is partially built into a hillside, consists of four levels of the departments of city government, where the public has wide access. The brick largely transfers over to the exterior of this section, and it is joined by materials such as quarry tile inside. The use of these terra cotta products relates to the building's location on one of the original slopes of Boston, expressed in the open, brick-paved plaza, and also to historic Boston's brick architecture, seen in the adjoining Sears Crescent block and the Blackstone Block buildings across Congress Street.

The intermediate portion of City Hall houses the public elected officials: the Mayor, the City Council members, and the Council Chamber. The large scale and the protrusion of these interior spaces on the outside, instead of being buried deep within the building, reveal the important public functions to the passers-by and are intended to create a visual and symbolic connection between the city and its government. The effect is of a small city of concrete-sheltered structures cantilevered above the plaza: large forms that house important civic activities.

The upper stories contain the city's office space, which are used by civil servants not visited frequently by the public, such as the administrative and planning departments. The bureaucratic nature is reflected in the standardized window patterns, separated by pre-cast concrete fins, with an open office plan typical of modern office buildings. (The subsequent enclosure of much of this space into separate offices contributed to the ventilation problems of those floors.)

The top of the brick base was designed as an elevated courtyard melding the fourth floor of the city hall with the plaza. Security concerns caused city officials in recent years to block access to the courtyard and the outdoor stairways to Congress Street and the plaza. The courtyard is occasionally opened up for events (such as the celebration of the Boston Celtics championship in 1986). After the September 11 attacks in 2001, security was further increased. The north entrance, facing the plaza, was barricaded with jersey barriers and bicycle racks. All visitors entering the front and the back entrances must pass through metal detectors.

City Hall was constructed by using mainly cast-in-place and precast Portland cement concrete and some masonry. About half of the concrete used in the building was precast (roughly 22,000 separate components), and the other half was poured-in-place concrete. All of the concrete in the structure, except that of the columns, is mixed with a light, coarse rock. While the majority of the building is created using concrete, precast and poured-in-place concrete are distinguishable by their different colors and textures. For example, cast-in-place elements are coarse and grainy textured because the concrete was poured into fir wood frames to mold it, and precast elements, such as trusses and supports, were set in steel molds to gain smooth, clean surfaces. This distinction also originates from the different types of cement used: the exterior poured-in-place pieces are of type I cement, a lightly colored cement, while the exterior precast components use type II cement, a dark-colored cement. The base of the building is dark with brick, Welsh quarry tiles, mahogany walls, and darker concrete. As the building ascends, the overall color lightens, as lighter concrete is used.

Reception 
The public response to Boston City Hall continues to be sharply divided. Arguments for and against continued use of the structure provoke strong counter-arguments from politicians, local press, design professionals, and the general public. City Hall was given two stars by the Michelin Green Guide, which said that the building "has been one of Boston's controversial architectural statements since its completion in 1968." The building's 50th anniversary in 2019 prompted both positive and negative commentary. In the 2021 Boston mayoral election, candidates for mayor Andrea Campbell, John Barros, and Kim Janey voiced negative opinions on it, Annissa Essaibi George was neutral on it, while Michelle Wu voiced positive opinions on it.

Positive 
While assessment of the building's architecture has been influenced by the vagaries of changing architectural style, the building at the time was acclaimed by some architects as well as by the professional association, American Institute of Architects, which gave the building its Honor Award in 1969.

Representative of the contemporary praise was the opinion of The New York Times critic Ada Louise Huxtable, who wrote that "in this focal building Boston sought, and got, excellence." Historian Walter Muir Whitehill wrote that 
"it is as fine a building for its time and place as Boston has ever produced. Traditionalists who long for a revival of Bulfinch simply do not realize that one does not achieve a handsome monster either by enlarging, or endlessly multiplying, the attractive elements of smaller structures."

Architect, educator, and writer Donlyn Lyndon wrote in The Boston Globe, "Boston City Hall carries an authority that results from the clarity, articulation, and intensity of imagination with which it has been formed." Architectural historian Douglass Shand-Tucci, author of Built in Boston: City and Suburb, 1800–2000, called City Hall "one of America's foremost landmarks" and "arguably the great building of twentieth-century Boston." In the AIA Guide to Boston, Susan and Michael Southworth wrote that "the award-winning City Hall had established its architect's reputation and inspired similar buildings across the nation."

Stylistically, City Hall is considered by some to be a leading example of Brutalist architecture.  It is listed among the "Greatest Buildings" by Great Buildings Online, an affiliate of Architecture Week. Additionally, in a 1976 Bicentennial poll of historians and architects regarding the United States' greatest buildings, sponsored by the American Institute of Architects, Boston City Hall received the sixth-most mentions.

When Boston's Mayor Menino stirred controversy in 2010 with a discussion of selling City Hall (see below), opponents of the proposal expressed praise of the building for its influence, design originality, and symbolism as a marker of Boston's rebirth in the 1960s. Supporters of the building applied to the Boston Landmarks Commission for its designation as a landmark, with supporting signatures and letters from architecture critic Jane Holtz Kay, Friends of the Public Garden President Henry Lee, and others. The Boston Globe published editorials recognizing the building's importance. Architecture critic Ada Louise Huxtable wrote an article published in The Wall Street Journal in which she contrasted the poor treatment of Boston City Hall with Yale University's recent sympathetic restoration of its similarly challenging Brutalist landmark, the Art and Architecture Building by architect Paul Rudolph.  In 2009 a major exhibition of the original design drawings for City Hall, now part of the archive of Historic New England, was mounted at the Wentworth Institute of Technology. In 2015, Boston Globe columnist Dante Ramos wrote that "if we see the enduring value in Heroic-era architecture, we can also hope for a measure of boldness — and recognize the downside of being too timid." A 2019 essay by Anthony Flint argued that City Hall is "an elegant, successful work of architecture." In 2019, a commemorative pin was produced in honor of the building's 50th anniversary.  In an essay written during the anniversary year, architect Aaron Betsky wrote that City Hall "is one of the last concrete examples of government willing to fight for what it thinks is right, which is, or should be, or common good."

Negative 

Popular news media considers City Hall the "world's ugliest building", including the Boston Globe and the Telegraph.

In the 1960s, Mayor John F. Collins reportedly gasped as the design was first unveiled, and someone in the room blurted out, "What the hell is that?" City Hall is very unpopular with some Bostonians, as it is with some employees of the building. In 2006 some described it as a dark and unfriendly eyesore. In part, such opinions are a reaction against greater Boston's numerous examples of concrete modernism from the 1960s.

The post-9/11 environment has dramatically changed what had been intended as a civil center and community space on the stairways and plaza around the building. Public access has been sharply reduced by the erection of security barriers and closing of numerous entrances.

In addition, the building's popularity declined as the tide turned away from modernism in New England to more traditional and post-modern styles in the 1970s and 1980s. The building was no longer new, architectural monumentality fell out of favor, and the idea of a "new" era and a "new" Boston became old-fashioned. The changes in style coincided with political changes, as Kevin White's mayoral administration ended.

Under subsequent administrations, which focused on neighborhoods rather than the center city, and decentralization instead of centralized civic power, funding was funneled away from City Hall. Compared to the Boston Public Library, some users and occupants have found City Hall to be unpleasant and dysfunctional. It has been the butt of jokes in some local magazines. The structure's complex interior spaces and sometimes-confusing floor plan have not been mitigated by quality wayfinding, signage, graphics or lighting.

A commentator wrote in 2006 that "I believe it's only a matter of time, and it will have to be totally removed, not modified, not retrofitted, not adapted." In 2008, the building was voted "World's Ugliest Building" in an online poll by the travel agency Virtualtourist. A number of news outlets picked up that moniker, and Mayor Tom Menino adopted it during his long tenure as a boon to tourism. A 2013 essay by columnist Paul McMorrow in the Boston Globe described it as "the worst building in the city" and advocated demolition. Curbed Boston included City Hall on its 2018 list of Boston's "10 ugliest buildings." A 2016 Boston Globe essay about "Boston flops, flubs, and failures" said City Hall was "cracking internally like a dead molar waiting to be pulled.

Plaza 

The surrounding City Hall Plaza has experienced a similar change in assessment over time. Although its recessed fountain, trees, and umbrella-shaded tables drew crowds in its early years, the space has more recently been cited as problematic in terms of design and urban planning. To illustrate the range of opinion regarding the Plaza, in 2004 the Project for Public Spaces identified it as the worst single public plaza worldwide out of hundreds of contenders, and it has placed the plaza on its "Hall of Shame." On the other hand, in 2009, The Cultural Landscape Foundation included City Hall Plaza as one of 13 national "Marvels of Modernism" in its exhibition and publication.  Several rounds of efforts to liven up City Hall Plaza have yielded only minimal changes, with the challenge being, in part, the numerous approvals required at the city, state, and federal levels.

Proposed changes 

In 2001, some City Hall workers complained that they were suffering from sick building syndrome. However, consultants hired by the city "did not identify any building-wide or acute air-quality issues."

Since 2006, a number of proposals have been made to modify City Hall or to demolish it and replace it with a new building on another site.

On December 12, 2006, Boston Mayor Thomas Menino proposed selling the current city hall and adjacent plaza to private developers and moving the city government to a site in South Boston. Amid his plans, in April 2007, the Boston Landmarks Commission reviewed a petition to make the building a city landmark, supported by a group of architects and preservationists. On July 10, 2008, a Landmarks Commission official said that the petition to designate the building as a landmark had been accepted for study, giving the building pending landmark status. Members of the group Citizens for City Hall also opposed Mayor Menino's plan to build a new City Hall on the South Boston waterfront because it would be a major inconvenience for tens of thousands of city residents. In December 2008, Menino suspended his plan to move City Hall as the Great Recession set in, stating, "I can't consciously move ahead on a major project like this at this time."

An advocacy group, Friends of Boston City Hall, was established to help develop support for preserving and enhancing City Hall and improving the Plaza. In 2010, the Boston Society of Architects held a competition for ideas for modifying City Hall. In March 2011, plans were announced to rethink the building and its surrounding plaza.

While a candidate for Mayor of Boston, Martin J. Walsh called for the sale of City Hall for mixed-use redevelopment.  But after his election, Walsh did not pursue such a sale. In 2015, the City of Boston launched a "Rethink City Hall" program to gather ideas for changes to the building and to City Hall Plaza. The Getty Foundation awarded Boston a grant of $120,000 in 2017 to study ways to preserve and enhance City Hall and its plaza. The Foundation noted "a shift in public sentiment" in recent years, "with many residents now embracing the site as a key feature of the city fabric." Suffolk University professor Harry Bartnick proposed that the building should be enclosed in a variegated glass sheath to make it more welcoming, less intimidating, and improve its energy efficiency. In August 2015, a developer's donations for a kitchen renovation was criticized by a fiscal watchdog.

In January 2016, Mayor Walsh announced plans to install new LED lighting on the exterior of the building.  "We are committed to creating a welcoming, lively City Hall Plaza," Walsh said. The lights were turned on in October 2016. A more extensive set of renovations, designed by the Boston firm Utile, was completed in 2018.  The renovations included new security and seating areas in the lobby, a coffee kiosk, new lighting, and new signage.

Nearby events
City Hall is located in Government Center, in Downtown Boston. The adjoining  City Hall Plaza is sometimes used for parades and rallies and, most memorably, the region's championship sports teams, the Boston Celtics, Boston Bruins, New England Patriots, and the Boston Red Sox, have been feted in front of City Hall. A huge crowd in the plaza also greeted Queen Elizabeth II during her 1976 Bicentennial visit, as she walked from the Old State House to City Hall to have lunch with the Mayor.

From 2013 to 2016, City Hall Plaza was home to the Boston Calling Music Festival.

Since November 2016, the plaza has been home to Boston Winter, a holiday-themed shopping center, complete with a skating rink and other holiday events, held annually from November to January.

Gallery

See also
 Palace of Culture (Messina), a similar building

Boston municipal government history
 Old City Hall (Boston)
 First Town-House, Boston
 Mayor of Boston
 John F. Collins, mayor of Boston (1960–1968)
 City Hall, a film by Frederick Wiseman

Site history
 Brattle Street (Boston)
 Cornhill, Boston
 Edward J. Logue
 Scollay Square

Further reading

References
Notes

Bibliography

External links

 

1969 establishments in Massachusetts
Brutalist architecture in Massachusetts
City Hall
Boston
Financial District, Boston
Government buildings completed in 1969
Government Center, Boston
City Hall